Kirton Holme is a village in Lincolnshire, England.

Kirton Holme church, Christ Church, is part of the Brothertoft Group also known as 'Five in the Fen', which also includes: 
 St Gilbert of Sempringham, Brothertoft
 St Margaret of Scotland, Langrick
 All Saints, Holland Fen
 St Peter, Wildmore
The village County Primary School was erected in 1879 after the formation of the Kirton School Board, but closed in 1968.

Kirton Holme Golf Club is a nine-hole golf course, established in 1992.

References

Villages in Lincolnshire
Borough of Boston
Kirton, Lincolnshire